Ned Hollister (November 26, 1876 – November 3, 1924) was an American biologist primarily known for studying mammals.

Hollister was born in Delavan, Wisconsin, to parents Kinner Newcomb Hollister (1841–1911) and Frances Margaret (Tilden) Hollister (1845–1927). He attended Delavan High School.

From 1916 until his death he was Superintendent of the National Zoological Park.  In 1921 he served as president of the Biological Society of Washington. When Hollister was twelve, he gained an interest in birds as he studied under Ludwig Kumlien, who was a professor at Milton College. At the age of 16, Hollister wrote his first papers on ornithology. At the age of 18, Hollister was elected to the American Ornithologists' Union. Hollister was designated to be the assistant curator of mammals at the U.S. National Museum in 1910. In the year of 1912, Hollister worked for the Smithsonian. In the year of 1916, Ned Hollister was then designated to be the superintendent of the National Zoological Park. This is the place where he continued to work until he died. Hollister was recorded to be a man that was a quiet and keen observer, and he was very systematic in the way he worked.

Hollister died on November 3, 1924 in Washington D.C at the age of 47.

Works

The Birds of Wisconsin (1903)
A Systematic Synopsis of Muskrats (1911)
Mammals of the Philippine Islands (1912)
Mammals of Alpine Club Expedition to Mount Robson (1913)
Philippine Land Mammals in the U.S. National Museum (1913)
A Systematic Account of the Grasshopper Mice (1914)
A Systematic Account of the Prairie-dogs

References 

American mammalogists
American taxonomists
1876 births
1924 deaths
People from Delavan, Wisconsin
Scientists from Wisconsin
19th-century American zoologists
20th-century American zoologists